Valentina Mikhailovna Maksimova (born 21 May 1937) is a retired Russian track cyclist. She won silver medals in the sprint at four consecutive world championships in 1958–1961, behind Galina Ermolaeva. Between 1953 and 1955 she set seven Soviet records in 200–500 m events.

Maksimova graduated from the Institute of Pedagogy in Tula and then from the Russian State University of Physical Education, Sport, Youth and Tourism, where she also defended a PhD on training sprint cyclists. From 1985 to 1993 she headed the women's section of the Soviet Cycling Federation, and since 1988 was an executive member of the Russian Cycling Federation.

References 

1937 births
Living people
Russian female cyclists
Sportspeople from Tula, Russia
Soviet female cyclists